α-Methyldopamine (α-Me-DA), also known as 3,4-dihydroxyamphetamine (3,4-DHA or HHA), is a research chemical of the catecholamine and amphetamine chemical classes.  Its bis-glutathionyl metabolite is slightly neurotoxic when directly injected into the brain's ventricles.

Interest lies in the fact that MDA and MDMA may not themselves be responsible for their neurotoxicity, as an intracerebroventricular injection does not appear to cause neurotoxicity.  While many studies suggest excitotoxicity or oxidative stress as likely mechanisms, which may be an effect of MDMA itself, this has led to the search for other mechanisms for the observed toxicity of serotonin axons and subsequent reduction in 5-HT (serotonin) and 5-HIAA (its major metabolite in the body) in vivo following administration.  A common theory follows that a metabolite in the periphery must be responsible, and several have been cited as responsible.  Although alpha-methyldopamine is widely cited as the source of this neurotoxicity in a number of lay sources, McCann, et al. (1991), demonstrated that the major metabolites alpha-methyldopamine (α-Me-DA or HHA) and 3-O-methyl-α-methyldopamine (3-O-Me-α-MeDA or HMA) did not produce neurotoxicity.

It was first demonstrated, in 1978, by Conway, et al. and possibly others that, while alpha-methyldopamine caused acute decreases in the levels of neuronal dopamine, in some areas of the brain in excess of 75%, levels returned to baseline within 12 hours, indicating that alpha-methyldopamine could not be responsible for the toxic effects observed.

However, the story complicates as alpha-methyldopamine readily oxidizes to the o-quinone and reacts with endogenous antioxidants in the body, such as glutathione (GSH). It was demonstrated by Miller, et al. (1997), that 5-(glutathion-S-yl)-alpha-methyldopamine and 5-(N-acetylcystein-S-yl)-alpha-methyldopamine produced similar effects to the parent compound, but did not induce neurotoxicity when injected intracerebroventricularly.  However the derivative metabolite 2,5-bis-(glutathion-S-yl)-alpha-methyldopamine (injected at ≈1.5x the usual per-kg MDMA dose) did in fact induce neurotoxicity, providing initial evidence that this metabolite may be the source of neuronal toxicity following the administration of MDA and MDMA, and the subsequent reduction in 5-HT (Serotonin) axons.

See also 
 α-Methylnorepinephrine
 α-Methyltyramine

References 

Substituted amphetamines
Catecholamines
Neurotoxins